Yevgeny Morozov (12 January 1929 – 23 March 2021) was a Soviet rower. He competed in the men's coxed pair event at the 1952 Summer Olympics.

References

1929 births
2021 deaths
Soviet male rowers
Olympic rowers of the Soviet Union
Rowers at the 1952 Summer Olympics
Rowers from Saint Petersburg